Corina Crivăț (born 24 September 1958) is a Romanian volleyball player. She competed in the women's tournament at the 1980 Summer Olympics.

References

External links
 

1958 births
Living people
Romanian women's volleyball players
Olympic volleyball players of Romania
Volleyball players at the 1980 Summer Olympics
Volleyball players from Bucharest